The Church of San Buenaventura in Casablanca, Morocco was founded by Franciscan Catholics around 1890. Built on territory Sultan Hassan I of Morocco granted to King Alfonso XII, it was the seat of the Spanish church in Casablanca from the late 19th century. 

It ceased to operate as a church in 1968, after which it hosted families in need. The Spanish Embassy ceded the property to the city of Casablanca.

Around 2016, the 1250 m site was transformed into a cultural center serving the community of the medina.

References 

Churches in Africa

Christianity and Islam
Religious buildings and structures in Casablanca